The 1997 San Jose Clash season was the second season of the team's existence. San Jose finished the season in fifth place missing the playoffs for the first time. The season also saw head coach Laurie Calloway replaced by Brian Quinn halfway through the season. Controversy surrounded Eric Wynalda and Laurie Calloway. Tayt Ianni, Mac Cozier, Edumundo Rodriguez and Tom Liner were released halfway through the season when Calloway was replaced. Daniel Guzman played in only three games for the Clash before returning to Mexico.

Squad

Current squad

Competitions

Major League Soccer

Matches 

(SO) = Shootout

U.S. Open Cup

Source:

Friendlies

Standings

References

External links
San Jose Earthquakes season stats | sjearthquakes.com
San Jose Earthquakes Game Results | Soccerstats.us
San Jose Earthquakes 100 Greatest Goals 1997 | YouTube

1997
San Jose Clash
San Jose Clash
San Jose Clash